Crematogaster dohrni, is a species of ant of the subfamily Myrmicinae, which is a widespread species that can be found from Sri Lanka, India, Indonesia, Thailand, and China.

Subspecies
Crematogaster dohrni artifex Mayr, 1879 - India, Thailand, China
Crematogaster dohrni dohrni Mayr, 1879 - Sri Lanka, China
Crematogaster dohrni fabricans Forel, 1911 - Indonesia
Crematogaster dohrni gigas Forel, 1913 - Sri Lanka
Crematogaster dohrni kerri Forel, 1911 - Thailand
Crematogaster dohrni kiangsiensis Forel, 1903 - China

Behavior and Ecology
C. dohrni is one of multiple ant species known to tend to scale insects, with this species in particular being known to feed on the honeydew excretions of Saissetia formicarii on tea bushes in Assam and West Bengal. This ant however only tends to small numbers of scale insects, and the bulk of their diet comes from other sources, with insects visiting or feeding on the tea bushes being their main prey. C. dohrni is known to transport these scale insects, being their main method of dispersal, and does so to move the scale insects to more favorable sites.

This ant is also known to live in mutualistic association with myrmecophytes. While the ant protects these plants from herbivores, it also has negative impacts on the fruit production of Humboldtia brunonis.

C. dohrni was one of the most abundant species in the gut contents of a juvenile Chinese pangolin found in Hong Kong after the mammal was killed by dogs on November 24, 2013.

References

External links

 at antwiki.org
Animaldiversity.org
It is.org

dohrni
Hymenoptera of Asia
Insects described in 1879